Laurent Boudouani (born 29 December 1966) is French former professional boxer who competed from 1989 to 1999. He held the WBA light middleweight title from 1996 to 1999 and the European light middleweight title from 1992 to 1993. As an amateur, he won a silver medal in the welterweight event at the 1988 Summer Olympics.

Olympic results
 1st round bye
 Defeated Imre Bacskai (Hungary) 4-1
 Defeated Darren Obah (Australia) 5-0
 Defeated Song Kyung-Sup (South Korea) 3-2
 Defeated Kenneth Gould (United States) 4-1
 Lost to Robert Wangila (Kenya) KO by 2

Professional career
Boudouani turned professional in 1989 and had two early victories over future titlist Javier Castillejo prior to capturing the WBA Light Middleweight Title by defeating Julio César Vásquez by fifth-round KO. Boudouani successfully defended his title four times, including victories over Carl Daniels, Guillermo Jones, and boxing great Terry Norris. Boudouani lost his title to Olympian David Reid in 1999 by unanimous decision and retired after the bout.

Professional boxing record

See also
List of world light-middleweight boxing champions

References

External links

 

1966 births
Living people
French male boxers
Sportspeople from Haute-Savoie
French sportspeople of Algerian descent
Olympic boxers of France
Olympic silver medalists for France
Boxers at the 1988 Summer Olympics
Olympic medalists in boxing
Medalists at the 1988 Summer Olympics
Welterweight boxers
World light-middleweight boxing champions
European Boxing Union champions
World Boxing Association champions